Salesian College was a Roman Catholic voluntary-aided school for boys aged 11 to 16 (previously 11 to 18, until it had to jettison its Sixth Form). It was founded in 1895 in Battersea, London, by the religious order of the Salesians of Don Bosco, who arrived in Battersea in 1887 as part of Don Bosco's dream to establish a Salesian presence in Great Britain and the British Empire, with its missionary potential. The College aimed to provide an education loosely based on the principles of St John Bosco, founder of the Salesians of Don Bosco.

History
At the end of August 2011 Salesian College and the John Paul II School, both in Wandsworth Borough, merged to create a new school - St John Bosco College. This opened on 1 September 2011 and occupied the Wimbledon site of the former John Paul II School. St John Bosco College moved to the old Surrey Lane site when the new buildings were completed in 2015. In the meantime, it has served as the location of BBC3 sitcom Bad Education and art studios of the Association for Cultural Advancement through Visual Art (ACAVA).

Notable former pupils

 Brian Curtin, former Irish judge.
 Kevin Day, comedy writer and sports presenter.
 Brian J. Dooley, human rights activist.
 Andrew Grima, jewellery designer. 
 Sir Alfred Hitchcock, KBE, film director; only spent one week there (as a boarder in 1908).
 Bryan Marshall, actor.
 Mgr Nicholas Morrish, Regional Vicar of Opus Dei for Great Britain since 1998.
 Lord O'Donnell, GCB, former Cabinet Secretary.
 Jim Reid-Anderson, Chairman, President & CEO of Six Flags.
 Yuri "Aggro" Santos, Brazilian-born rapper.
Jed Shepherd, screenwriter, producer, and director.
 Joseph Spence, Master of Dulwich College
 Catherine Tate, comedian, actress, personality.
 Danny Thompson, writer.
 Patrick Wilde, playwright and screenwriter.
Martin McDonagh, playwright, screenwriter, and producer.

References

External links
Salesian College website
Salesians of Don Bosco UK
Saint John Bosco School website
Graham Wilmer Salesian abuse victim

Salesian secondary schools
Boys' schools in London
Educational institutions established in 1895
Defunct schools in the London Borough of Wandsworth
Defunct Catholic schools in the Archdiocese of Southwark
1895 establishments in England
Educational institutions disestablished in 2011
2011 disestablishments in England
Buildings and structures in Battersea